Three 6 Mafia Presents: Hypnotize Camp Posse is the self-titled first-and-only studio album by Hypnotize Camp Posse, a collaboration of Three 6 Mafia with members of its label, Hypnotize Minds. The Hypnotize Camp Posse group is essentially a larger or "broader" form of Three 6 Mafia, as it includes all the members of Three 6 Mafia as well as all the artists signed to Hypnotize Minds. All the artists featured on the album were Hypnotize Minds artists with the exception of guest artist Pastor Troy, a member of the Atlanta-based group D.S.G.B. (Down South Georgia Boys). The album was released by Loud Records and Hypnotize Minds on January 25, 2000 and distributed through RED Distribution.

On February 12, 2000, the album debuted at #1 on the US Billboard Independent Albums chart.

Track listing 

 All tracks are produced by DJ Paul and Juicy J

Artists 
All performers featured on the album were members of Hypnotize Camp Posse and signed to Hypnotize Minds when the album was recorded, with the exception of Pastor Troy, who appears as a guest artist on "Big Mouth, Big Talk" and is also credited as a co-producer on 8 tracks.

Thirteen members of Hypnotize Camp Posse make lyrical appearances on the album, including all six full members of Three 6 Mafia.

 DJ Paul: performer (8 tracks), producer (all tracks)
 Juicy J: performer (7 tracks), producer (all tracks)
 Lord Infamous: performer (6 tracks)
 Project Pat: performer (6 tracks)
 T-Rock: performer (6 tracks)
 La Chat: performer (5 tracks)
 Crunchy Black: performer (4 tracks)
 Gangsta Boo: performer (4 tracks)
 Koopsta Knicca: performer (4 tracks)
 M.C. Mack: performer (2 tracks)
 Scan Man: performer (2 tracks)
 Lil Pat: performer (1 track), 
 Mr. Del: performer (1 track)
 Frayser Boy: additional vocals (track 5)

Charts

References 

2000 albums